The 2016 CONCACAF Women's Olympic Qualifying Championship was an international football tournament that was held in the United States between 10 and 21 February 2016. The 8 national teams involved in the tournament were required to register a squad of 20 players; only players in these squads were eligible to take part in the tournament.

Players marked (c) were named as captain for their national squad. Totals for caps and goals, club affiliations, and ages are as of the opening day of the tournament on 10 February 2016.

Group A

Costa Rica
Head coach: Amelia Valverde

Mexico
Head coach: Leonardo Cuéllar

Puerto Rico
The squad was announced on 30 January 2016.

Head coach: Garabet Avedissian

United States
The final 20-player squad was announced on 26 January 2016.

Head coach: Jill Ellis

Group B

Canada
Head coach: John Herdman

Guatemala
Head coach: Benjamín Monterroso

Guyana
Head coach: Mark Rodrigues

Trinidad and Tobago
Head coach: Richard Hood

References

External links

Squads
Association football women's tournament squads